The following is a timeline of the history of the city of Pavia in the Lombardy region of Italy.

Prior to 18th century

 220 BCE - Romans in power; settlement named Ticinum (approximate date).
 397 CE - Roman Catholic Diocese of Pavia established (approximate date).
 452 CE - Pavia sacked by Hun forces of Attila.
 475 - Pavia sacked during conflict between forces of Odoacer and Roman Orestes.
 569 - Siege of Pavia (569–72) by Lombard forces begins.
 572 - Lombards in power.
 773-774 - Siege of Pavia (773–74); Frankish forces of Charlemagne win.
 887 - Coronation of Berengar I as king of Italy takes place in Pavia.
 924 - Pavia besieged by Hungarian forces.
 950 - Coronation of Berengar II and Adalbert as kings of Italy.
 951 - Marriage of Otto I and Adelaide.
 971 - Pietro Campanora becomes bishop.
 11th century - Civic Tower (Pavia) built.
 1024 -  (royal palace) destroyed.
 1056 - Milan-Pavia conflict.
 1132 - San Pietro in Ciel d'Oro church consecrated.
 1155
 San Michele Maggiore church rebuilt.
 Coronation of Frederick I, Holy Roman Emperor.
 1198 -  (assembly area) built.
 1315 - Pavia attacked by Ghibelline forces.
 1354 - Ponte Coperto (covered bridge) rebuilt.
 1356 - Pavia besieged by forces of Visconti.
 1359 - Galeazzo II Visconti in power.
 1361 - Studium Generale founded.
 1363 - Petrarch moves to Pavia.
 1365 - Castello Visconteo (castle) built.
 1374 - Santa Maria del Carmine church construction begins.
 1447 - Young Christopher Columbus studies at the Studium Generale (approximate date).
 1473 - Printing press in operation.
 1485 - University of Pavia active.
 1488 - Cathedral of San Martino construction begins.
 1495 - Certosa di Pavia (monastery) built near town.
 1499 -  established.
 1521 - Giovanni Maria Ciocchi del Monte becomes bishop.
 1525 - Battle of Pavia fought during the Italian War of 1521–26.
 1527 -  by French forces.
 1561 - University's Collegio Borromeo established.
 1567 - University's Ghislieri College established.

18th-19th centuries
 1706 - Pavia occupied by Austrian forces.
 1733 - Pavia occupied by French forces.
 1743 - Pavia occupied by French and Spanish forces.
 1746 - Austrians in power.
 1771 - University's Natural History Museum founded.
 1772 -  (library) established.
 1773
 Teatro Fraschini (theatre) opens.
 Orto Botanico dell'Università di Pavia (garden) founded.
 1796 - May: Pavia sacked by French forces.
 1814 - Austrian rule restored.
 1830 - Birth of Luigi Cremona, later an Italian mathematician.
 1848 - March: Sardinians in power.
 1859
 Pavia becomes part of the Kingdom of Sardinia.
  (administrative region) established.
 1862 - Pavia-Cava railway begins operating.
 1866
  (railway) begins operating.
 War monument erected.
 1867 - Pavia railway station built.
 1870 - La Provincia Pavese newspaper begins publication.
 1872 - Fortifications dismantled.
 1880 -  (tram) begins operating.
 1882
 Pavia–Stradella railway begins operating.
 Covered market built.
 1884 -  (tram) begins operating.
 1885 - Corriere Ticinese newspaper begins publication.
 1897 - Population: 39,058.

20th century

 1901 -  (historical society) founded.
 1911
 A.C. Pavia (football club) formed.
 Population: 39,898.
 1913 -  begins operating.
 1951 - Ponte Coperto (bridge) rebuilt.
 1952 -  begins operating.
 1989 - 17 March: Civic Tower collapses.

21st century

 2001 - LINE Servizi per la Mobilità (transit entity) established.
 2009 -  held; Alessandro Cattaneo becomes mayor.
 2013 - Population: 68,313.
 2014 - Local election held; Massimo Depaoli becomes mayor.

See also
 
 List of mayors of Pavia
 List of bishops of Pavia
  (state archives)
 History of Lombardy (it)

Timelines of other cities in the macroregion of Northwest Italy:(it)
 Liguria region: Timeline of Genoa 
 Lombardy region: Timeline of Bergamo; Brescia; Cremona; Mantua; Milan
 Piedmont region: Timeline of Novara; Turin

References

This article incorporates information from the Italian Wikipedia.

Bibliography

 . 14th century

in English

in Italian
 
 
  (Timeline)
 
 
  1894-
 
  1984-1992 (3 volumes)

External links

 Items related to Pavia, various dates (via Europeana)
 Items related to Pavia, various dates (via Digital Public Library of America)

Pavia
Pavia
pavia